Hans Rothenberg, born 1961, is a business development specialist and a member of the Swedish Parliament for the Moderate Party. He is member of the Committee on Industry and Trade and substitute to the Committee on Cultural Affairs. His constituency is the city of Gothenburg.

References
Hans Rothenberg (M)

Members of the Riksdag from the Moderate Party
1961 births
Living people
Articles containing video clips
Members of the Riksdag 2006–2010
Members of the Riksdag 2010–2014
Members of the Riksdag 2014–2018
Members of the Riksdag 2018–2022